The Natural and Agrarian Museum is a museum in Seac Pai Van Park, Coloane, Macau, China.

History
The museum was established on 21 March 1997.

Architecture
The museum is housed in a wooden-style little house. It consists of five sections, which are Geography of Macau, Farming Tools of the Islands in Olden Days, Lives of Farmers, Specimens of Animals and Specimens of Plants.

See also
 List of museums in Macau

References

1997 establishments in Macau
Coloane
Museums established in 1997
Museums in Macau